Budawang National Park is a national park in New South Wales, Australia, located approximately  southwest of Sydney and  north of Batemans Bay. It contains part of the Budawang Mountain Range.

Budawang National Park is named after Mount Budawang. The mountain itself derives from the Aboriginal word 'Buddawong'. The vantage point afforded by the mountain was originally used to make signal fires.

The Budawang National Park is largely isolated. Its terrain is steep and rugged. The park comprises high-elevation moist forests.

Landscape
Most of the Budawang National Park lies within the southern Budawang Range. This range is characterized by rugged terrain, steep slopes and deeply incised valleys.

Wildlife
Budawang National Park's diverse landscape has created pockets of unique habitats where several plant and animal species survive.

Plants
The middle and high slopes of the hills in the park are covered in cool temperate rainforest. In the lower elevations, which are drained by small rivers and streams, the dominant vegetation is dry rainforest trees and ironwood.

Animals
The park supports good populations of swamp wallabies, greater gliders, and potoroos. Eastern grey kangaroos, common wombats, honeyeaters and white-throated tree creepers inhabit the open forest and woodland. Other notable bird species include green catbirds and lyrebirds.

Gallery

See also
 Protected areas of New South Wales

References

National parks of New South Wales
South Coast (New South Wales)
Protected areas established in 1977
1977 establishments in Australia
Southern Tablelands